Marcelle Arnold (4 May 1917 – 31 March 2010) was a French film, stage and television actress.

Selected filmography

 Dédée d'Anvers (1948) - Magda - la prostituée au perroquet
 All Roads Lead to Rome (1949) - Hermine
 Keep an Eye on Amelia (1949) - La dame en mauve
 No Pity for Women (1950) - (uncreidted)
 Le Sabre de mon père (1951) - Flore Médard
 Without Leaving an Address (1951) - Marguerite Forestier - la femme du dentiste
 Mr. Peek-a-Boo (1951) - Germaine
 Juliette, or Key of Dreams (1951) - La femme acariâtre
 Les Miracles n'ont lieu qu'une fois (1951) - La patronne du bar
 The Night Is My Kingdom (1951) - Germaine Latour
 Piédalu à Paris (1951)
 La Poison (1951) - Germaine (uncredited)
 Trois vieilles filles en folie (1952) - Joséphine
 Agence matrimoniale (1952) - (uncredited)
 La forêt de l'adieu (1952) - Hélène Queyrian
 Three Women (1952) - L'Anglaise
 Adieu Paris (1952) - Virginie
 Piédalu fait des miracles (1952)
 The Drunkard (1953) - Madame Fournier (uncredited)
 Les Compagnes de la nuit (1953) - 1ère assistante
 Children of Love (1953) - Une femme voulant adopter un enfant
 My Brother from Senegal (1953) - Mlle Angèle
 Service Entrance (1954) - Madame Courbessac
 People of No Importance (1956) - La concierge
 Marie Antoinette Queen of France (1956) - Mme. Adélaïde
 The Bride Is Much Too Beautiful (1956) - Mme. Victoire
 Les suspects (1957) - Lynda
 Ce joli monde (1957) - Marjorie Cleanwater, la romancière
 Secrets of a French Nurse (1958) - Madame Debrais
 Péché de jeunesse (1958) - La pâtissière Madame Rapine
 Croquemitoufle (1959) - (uncredited)
 Les amants de demain (1959)
 Lovers on a Tightrope (1960) - La standardiste
 The Seven Deadly Sins (1961) - L'épouse de Valentin (segment "Gourmandise, La")
 A Monkey in Winter (1962) - L'infirmière de la pension / Nurse
 Carom Shots (1963) - Mademoiselle Andréa
 The Reluctant Spy (1963) - Mlle Morin
 Pleins feux sur Stanislas (1965) - Morin
 Faites donc plaisir aux amis (1969) - Mme Barjon
 The Things of Life (1970) - La mère d'Hélène
 Où est passé Tom? (1971)
 Na! (1973)
 Un oursin dans la poche (1977) - La tantiette
 Est-ce bien raisonnable? (1981) - (final film role)

References

Bibliography
 Edward Baron Turk. Child of Paradise: Marcel Carné and the Golden Age of French Cinema. Harvard University Press, 1989.

External links

1917 births
2010 deaths
French film actresses
French stage actresses